Tony Avent is an American horticulturist and plantsman. He and wife and business partner, Anita Avent, own Plant Delights Nursery and Juniper Level Botanic Garden in Raleigh, North Carolina. In addition, he is a plant explorer, author and public speaker.

Early life and education 
Avent grew up with a passion for plants and nature. Instead of playing games, he wandered the woods and fields near his home in Raleigh NC, studying wildflowers. At age five, Avent was building terrariums and dish gardens with mail-order plants, and at seven years old, his parents built a greenhouse for him. There he grew and propagated plants and sold them as a hobby.

Tony Avent attended North Carolina State University and graduated in 1978 with a Bachelor of Science degree in Horticultural Science. He studied under the well renowned horticulturist J. C. Raulston. Avent was inspired by Raulston who built the JC Raulston Arboretum. In 1977, he married Michelle Morgan Avent (1957–2012).

Career 
In 1978, he began working for the North Carolina State Fairgrounds in Raleigh as its Landscape Director. He worked there for 16 years until 1994. In addition he worked as a volunteer curator of the Shade Garden at the J. C. Raulston Arboretum from 1985 to 1994. He also worked as a weekly garden columnist for Raleigh's News and Observer newspaper from 1987 to 1998. He established Plant Delights Nursery and Juniper Level Botanic Gardens in 1988 and by 1994 the business had expanded enough for him to resign his state job and become a full-time nurseryman.

In addition to running the nursery, Avent is a plant breeder who is best known for his Hosta breeding program, but is actively breeding other genera as well. In addition, Tony Avent travels the world on plant hunting expeditions to search for new, rare, and unusual plants. He is also an avid plant collector with a large collection of rare variegated Agave. He is a prolific writer as well, having authored a book (So You Want to Start a Nursery – 2003, Timber Press) and dozens of newspaper articles, magazine articles, and web articles. Avent was featured in the book, Heroes of Horticulture by Barbara Paul Robinson, 2018; Beautiful Madness by James Dodson, 2006; The Plant Hunter’s Garden by Bobby Ward, Fall 2004, and The Collector’s Garden Book by Ken Druse, 1996. He is currently a contributing editor to Fine Gardening Magazine. In addition, every year travels the country, having given over 800 lectures on gardening topics. He also lectures each year at Plant Delights Nursery. In 2018, Avent was named a Distinguished Alumni at his alma mater, North Carolina State University.

Avent is married to Raleigh business woman and childhood friend Anita Avent, a B.S. and MBA graduate of Meredith College. Anita Avent is also a mindfulness and nonduality teacher as well as a Board Certified Holistic Health Practitioner. She established the Center for Mindfulness and Nonduality at Juniper Level Botanic Gardens in 2013.  She is a former health insurance administrator, regulator, and director with Cigna, the State of North Carolina and a Preceptor and Faculty Associate at the Department of Health Policy and Administration at the University of North Carolina at Chapel Hill and mother to three adult children.  She is also an independent business strategist and healthcare industry consultant appointed by Governor James B. Hunt, Jr. in 1996 to serve as a Rules Review Commissioner on the State of North Carolina Rules Review Commission.

Writing
Traditional media
 "Baptisia"- The Plantsman Magazine, UK – Fall 2006
 "Baptisia, the Redneck Lupines" – Horticulture Magazine – June 2002
 "Bizarre Plants Only a Mother Could Love" – American Nurseryman Magazine Jan 1997
 "Confessions of a Crazed Hosta Hybridizer" – American Hosta Society Journal 1989
 "Crape Murder, the Unkind Cut" – News and Observer – Spring 2008
 "Favorite New and Underused Perennials" – NM PRO Magazine Spring 2000
 "Fragrant Hostas for the Southeast" – Carolina Gardner Magazine – March 1999
 "Hardy Cacti for the Southeast" – Carolina Gardener Magazine – Fall 1994
 "Hardy Gesneriads – Exploring a Test Market" – Gesneriad Society Journal – April 2006
 "Hosta Breeders and Other Strangers" – American Hosta Society Journal 1992
 "Hostas for the Rock Garden" – The Trillium Newsletter Fall 1992
 "Hostas for Warm Climates" – Betrock Publications 1998
 "Leaves that Light up the Garden" – Fine Gardening Magazine Fall 1992
 "Plant Delights Nursery Profile" – American Hosta Society Journal 1994
 "Blue Hostas" – Fine Gardening November 1999
 "Plant Exploration in China" – The Trillium Newsletter Spring 1997
 "Plant Exploration in Korea" – American Hosta Society Journal Spring 1998
 "Plant Exploration in Mexico" – The Trillium Newsletter Spring 1995
 "Propagating and Selling Hosta" – NM PRO Magazine 1993
 "Roots, The Good, Bad, and the Ugly" – American Hosta Society Journal 1989
 "Running Hot and Cold/Plant Hardiness" – American Hosta Society Journal 1994
 "Selling and Sailing" – Nursery Manager Pro Magazine February 2000
 "Soil Preparation Part I" – American Hosta Society Journal Spring 1993
 "Soil Preparation Part II" – American Hosta Society Journal Fall 1993
 "Strange but True" – American Nurseryman Magazine May 1, 1997
 "The Curse of the Green Meatball" – Horticulture Magazine March/April 2004
 "The Trademark Myth" – NM Pro Magazine November 1999
 "The Twilight Zones" – Exploring the Mysteries of Plant Hardiness – Carolina Gardener Magazine Nov 2002
 "Trillium Tracking" – The Trillium Newsletter Summer 1998
 "Who Needs Privacy" – Fine Gardening Magazine Fall 1991

Books/chapters written by Avent:
 The Roots of My Obsession (one chapter) - Timber Press, 2012
 Bizarre Botanicals (Foreword) by Larry Mellichamp, 2010
 My Favorite Plant (one chapter) compiled by Jamaica Kincaid 1998
 So You Want to Start a Nursery – Timber Press (July 2003)

Programs/articles about Avent or Plant Delights Nursery
Newspapers
 Atlanta Journal-Constitution – June 6, 2002 (garden/plant profile)
 Chesterton Tribune, IND – November 14, 2002
 Chicago Tribune – Ken Druse, Sept 14,2003 – Gardener's fantasy and a reality check
 The Plain Dealer, Cleveland, Ohio – January 19, 2006 (nursery profile)
 Fairfield County Times, Connecticut – January 1998 (catalog profile)
 Garner Times, April 10, 1996 (nursery profile)
 Greensboro NC News and Record – March 1993
 Greenville Examiner – Oct 23, 2010 – NC plant hunter Tony Avent searches the world for new specimens
 High Point Enterprise – May 5, 1999 (nursery/garden profile)
 Houston Chronicle, GA – January 9, 2010 (nursery profile) – N.C. nursery's plant catalog always fun
 The Item, Sumter SC – March 13, 2004 (plant/nursery profile)
 The Louisville Courier-Journal – April 1996 (nursery profile)
 Maine Sunday Telegram – June 17, 2001(nursery/plant profile)
 The New York Newsday – February 1995 (plant profiles)
 The New York Times – February 2, 1997 (nursery/plant profile) 
 The New York Times – February 20, 1997 
 The New York Times – February 20, 2003 (nursery/book profile) 
 The New York Times – September 12, 2003 
 The New York Times – April 2006 (nursery profile) 
 The New York Times – April 28, 2010 
 The New York Times – April 29, 2010 
 The News and Observer October 19, 2002 (plant profiles)
 The News and Observer April 6, 2003 (personal profile)
 The News and Observer – December 26, 2006 (nursery)
 Philadelphia Inquirer – January 22, 1999 (nursery/plant profile)
 Pittsburgh Post-Gazette – February 10, 2001 (nursery/plant profile)
 Rochester Democrat and Chronicle – July 27, 2002 (nursery profile)
 West Virginia Gazette-Mail – February 1999 (plant profiles)

Magazines
 The American Gardener Magazine – Fall 1996 (personal profile)
 The American Gardener magazine – July/August 2006 (profile)
 Arbor Friends – Friends of US National Arboretum Newsletter – Winter 2008 (profile)
 Carolina Gardener Magazine – January 1997
 Columbus OH Garden Railway Society Magazine – October 1995 (plant profile)
 Early American Homes and Gardens – Spring 1999 (personal profile)
 Entrepreneur Magazine – October 1996 (nursery profile)
 Fine Gardening Magazine – February 2003 (plant profiles)
 Floridata On-Line Magazine – March 2004 (personal profile)
 Garden and Gun Magazine – June 2008 (personal profile)
 Garden Center Magazine – November 2008 (nursery profile)
 Greenhouse Manager PRO Magazine – "Innovator of the Month" – March 1998 (nursery profile)
 Greenhouse Manager PRO Magazine – "Catalog and Web Sales" – May 2000 (nursery profile)
 Grower Talks Magazine – Summer 1999
 Haven Magazine, Denmark – March 2005
 Horticulture Magazine – March 1997 (personal profile)
 House Beautiful magazine – November 1995 (nursery profile)
 International Aroid Society Newsletter – July 2002 (garden profile)
 Mirabella Magazine – April 1995
 NCSU Alumni Magazine – May 1994 (personal profile)
 NCSU Alumni Magazine – June 2006 (profile)
 NC Wildflower Preservation Society – Summer 1998
 North Carolina Magazine – June 1998 (nursery profile)
 North Fork Country, New York Journal – November 2002
 Nursery Manager PRO Magazine – November 1993
 Ornamental Outlook Magazine – December 1999 (nursery profile)
 Philadelphia Hort Society Green Scene Magazine – April 1996
 Plants Magazine, England – September 1999 (plant profiles)
 Southern Living Magazine – January 1994 (nursery profile)
 Southern Living magazine – August 2006 (garden)

Books
 Heroes of Horticulture by Barbara Paul Robinson, 2018
 Beautiful Madness by James Dodson, 2006 
 Bizarre Botanicals by Larry Mellichamp and Paula Gross, 2010 
 The Collectors Garden Book by Ken Druse 1996 
 The Plant Hunters Garden by Bobby Ward, Fall 2004  

TV shows
 Almanac Gardener with Mike Gray (NC Public Television) – numerous since 1994 
 Coastal Gardener with Dave Egbert (Network) – 2008
 Cultivating Life with Sean Conway, Aspidistra, Ferns (PBS) – 2006
 Cultivating Life with Sean Conway (PBS) – 2008
 Gardener's Diary with Erica Glasener (HGTV) – winter 2002/3
 Gardener's Journal with Kathy Renwald (HGTV) – 2002
 In The Garden with Bryce Lane (NC Public Television) – 2007
 Martha Stewart Living with Martha Stewart, Nursery Segment (HGTV) – February 2004
 Martha Stewart Living with Martha Stewart, Propagation Segment (HGTV) – February 2004
 Martha Stewart Living with Martha Stewart, Hardy Arailaceae Segment (HGTV) – February 2004
 Martha Stewart Living with Martha Stewart, Extreme Propagation (NBC) – February 2007
 Martha Stewart Living with Martha Stewart, New Plants (NBC) – March 2008
 Martha Stewart Living with Martha Stewart, New Plants (NBC) – January 26, 2011
 Rebecca's Garden with Rebecca Kolls (Hearst Broadcasting) – 1997
 The Winter Garden Series (HGTV) – 1999
 The Secret Garden Series (HGTV) – Spring 2001

References

External links
Plant Delights Nursery
Juniper Level Botanic Gardens
Nondu.org

American garden writers
American male non-fiction writers
American horticulturists
Living people
North Carolina State University alumni
Year of birth missing (living people)